The 1995 Dallas Cowboys season was the franchise's 36th season in the National Football League (NFL) and was the second year under head coach Barry Switzer and final of the three Super Bowl titles they would win during 1992 to 1995. Dallas would be the first team to ever win three Super Bowls in a span of four seasons (would be later matched by the New England Patriots from the 2001 to 2004 seasons). Switzer guided the Cowboys to a fifth Super Bowl win by defeating the Pittsburgh Steelers in Super Bowl XXX. As of 2023, this is the most recent time the Cowboys appeared in the NFC Championship Game, and in turn, their most recent Super Bowl appearance.

The last remaining active member of the 1995 Dallas Cowboys was offensive lineman Larry Allen, who retired after the 2007 season.

Offseason
The 1995 NFL draft was one of the worst in Dallas Cowboys history. It is infamously known as the "backup draft", because the team considered their roster so strong, they drafted players based on their contributions as backups, which limited the future potential of their selections. The team traded their first-round draft choice (28th overall) to the Tampa Bay Buccaneers (they selected Derrick Brooks), in exchange for two second-round picks. The best player drafted would end up being Eric Bjornson.

NFL draft

1995 Expansion Draft

Season summary
The 1995 season once more saw a number of key veterans depart via free agency due to the NFL salary cap, including wide receiver Alvin Harper to the Tampa Bay Buccaneers, safety James Washington to the Washington Redskins, center Mark Stepnoski to the Houston Oilers and longtime Cowboys veteran defensive end Jim Jeffcoat to the Buffalo Bills.  Starting cornerback Kevin Smith was out the remainder of the season after an injury in week one.  Perhaps the most prominent addition came on September 11, 1995, when Dallas signed All-Pro cornerback Deion Sanders away from the San Francisco 49ers.  Running back Emmitt Smith earned his fourth NFL rushing title and set a then-record 25 rushing touchdowns in a season against the Arizona Cardinals to secure home field advantage throughout the playoffs.

The season began with victories against the Giants, Broncos, Vikings in overtime, and Cardinals.   In week five at the Redskins, Troy Aikman was injured early and the Cowboys suffered their first loss of the season. Aikman returned the next week and led Dallas to wins over Green Bay, San Diego, the Falcons (marking Deion Sanders's debut game with the Cowboys), and the Eagles to move to 8–1.

In week ten, the struggling 49ers (only 5–4 and with Elvis Grbac substituting for injured Steve Young) came to Texas Stadium and shocked the Cowboys, 38–20; the game's signature play was San Francisco's second play from scrimmage, from the Niners' 19-yard line, as Grbac's pass split Dallas's safeties and Jerry Rice scored.

The win started a six-game win streak for San Francisco while Dallas rebounded, beating the Raiders and Chiefs to move to 10–2, but then was upset at home by the Washington Redskins (the Redskins, who finished only 6–10, swept the eventual world champions; it was the Skins' seventh win in fourteen meetings since the firing of Tom Landry).  The Cowboys lost their second game in a row in a controversial loss at Philadelphia where, with the game tied at 17 late in the fourth quarter, Coach Barry Switzer elected to "go for it" on 4th down and a foot at the Cowboys' 29-yard line. The Eagles initially stopped Dallas for no gain but the play was ruled dead because the two-minute warning was reached before Dallas snapped the ball. Switzer then elected to try again instead of punting, and this time the play was stopped for a 1-yard loss; Philly took over and soon kicked a field goal to get the win. While the Cowboys in general and Switzer in particular were excoriated by fans and the media, the team became stronger and angrier after this game (Deion Sanders publicly supported Switzer and the decision to try the 4th-down conversion) and eventually used those emotions to end the losing streak.

The next week, Dallas appeared headed for a third straight defeat at home to the mediocre Giants (only 5–9 entering the game) but thanks to a clutch late reception by Kevin Williams and a last-second field goal by Chris Boniol, the Cowboys prevailed.  Rejuvenated, the team defeated the Arizona Cardinals and (combined with a 49ers loss the day before) secured home field advantage throughout the playoffs.  The movie Jerry Maguire used film footage from the Arizona matchup.

The Cowboys defeated the Philadelphia Eagles in the NFC divisional playoff game followed by a memorable NFC championship game victory against the Green Bay Packers at Texas Stadium.  The team went on to face the Pittsburgh Steelers in the Super Bowl at Sun Devil Stadium in Arizona in an attempt to tie the NFL record of a fifth league title.  Dallas dominated early, but as the Steelers gained momentum and threatened an upset over the heavily favored Cowboys, starting cornerback Larry Brown, after the tragic loss of his son Kristopher during the season, made his second interception of a pass from Steelers quarterback Neil O'Donnell to seal the Cowboys' victory. Brown was named Super Bowl MVP after the game.

Preseason

Regular season

Standings

Playoffs

Postseason schedule

Divisional Playoffs vs Philadelphia Eagles

NFC Championship Game

Super Bowl XXX

Scoring summary
DAL – FG: Chris Boniol 42 yards 3–0 DAL
DAL – TD: Jay Novacek 3 yard pass from Troy Aikman (Chris Boniol kick) 10–0 DAL
DAL – FG: Chris Boniol 35 yards 13–0 DAL
PIT – TD: Yancey Thigpen 6 yard pass from Neil O'Donnell (Norm Johnson kick) 13–7 DAL
DAL – TD: Emmitt Smith 1 yard run (Chris Boniol kick) 20–7 DAL
PIT – FG: Norm Johnson 46 yards 20–10 DAL
PIT – TD: Byron "Bam" Morris 1 yard run (Norm Johnson kick) 20–17 DAL
DAL – TD: Emmitt Smith 4 yard run (Chris Boniol kick) 27–17 DAL

Staff

Roster

Awards and records
 Emmitt Smith, NFL rushing leader
 Larry Brown, Super Bowl Most Valuable Player

Milestones
 Michael Irvin, 100 Reception Season (Irvin finished the season with 111 receptions) 
 In 1995, Emmitt Smith won his fourth rushing title. He rushed for a career-high 1,773 yards.

Publications
 The Football Encyclopedia 
 Total Football 
 Cowboys Have Always Been My Heroes

References

External links
 
 Pro Football Hall of Fame
 Dallas Cowboys Official Site

NFC East championship seasons
National Football Conference championship seasons
Super Bowl champion seasons
Dallas Cowboys seasons
Dallas
Dallas